Tim Harrington (born 19 September 1963) is a former Australian rules footballer who played with North Melbourne, Collingwood and Footscray in the Victorian/Australian Football League (VFL/AFL).

A defender, used mostly as a full-back, Harrington came to North Melbourne from Oak Park. He played 20 games over three seasons with North Melbourne and then ended his career with stints at Collingwood and Footscray.

Footscray hired him as an assistant coach in 1992 and he remained with the club for three years. From 1995 to 2001 he was an assistant coach to Denis Pagan at North Melbourne, during which time they won two premierships. He was then North Melbourne's Football Manager for five years. In 2007 he was made List Manager of North Melbourne and two years later moved over to Melbourne, where he worked until 2013.

References

1963 births
Australian rules footballers from Victoria (Australia)
North Melbourne Football Club players
Collingwood Football Club players
Western Bulldogs players
Brunswick Football Club players
Living people